The 4th Vanier Cup was played on November 22, 1968, at Varsity Stadium in Toronto, Ontario, and decided the CIAU football champion for the 1968 season. The Queen's Golden Gaels won their first ever championship by defeating the Waterloo Lutheran Golden Hawks by a score of 42-14.

References

External links
 Official website

Vanier Cup
Vanier Cup
1968 in Toronto
November 1968 sports events in Canada
Canadian football competitions in Toronto